SS Rio Tercero was an Argentinian Cargo ship that the German submarine U-202 torpedoed on 22 June 1942 in the Atlantic Ocean  east of New York City while she was travelling from New York City to Buenos Aires, Argentina while carrying 3500 tons of general cargo including coal and mail.

Construction 
Rio Tercero was built at the Palmers Shipbuilding & Iron Co. Ltd. shipyard in Newcastle upon Tyne, United Kingdom in December 1912. Where she was launched and completed that same year. The ship could reach a maximum speed of 11 knots and could generate 566 n.h.p.

Sinking 
Rio Tercero was travelling from New York City, New York, United States to Buenos Aires, Argentina carrying 3500 tons of general cargo including coal and mail. The torpedo hit the starboard side, and resulted in a secondary explosion of one of the boilers. However Argentina was neutral during the war which meant that Rio Tercero shouldn't have been attacked or sunk by U-202 or any submarine for that matter. The commander of U-202 Kapitänleutnant Hans-Heinz Linder later reported that Rio Tercero had not displayed any neutrality markings and was only recognized as an Argentinian vessel after the attack due to the questioning of the survivors. Rio Tercero sent an SOS before sinking; U-202 was subsequently attacked by US aircraft and was forced to dive away. The survivors were rescued by submarine chaser USS SC-503.

Wreck 

References

Cargo ships of the United Kingdom
Steamships of Argentina
Shipwrecks in the Atlantic Ocean
World War II shipwrecks in the Atlantic Ocean
Ships sunk by German submarines in World War II
Maritime incidents in June 1942
Ships built on the River Tyne
1912 ships